Smarajit Jana (died 2021) was a public health scientist of the All India Institute of Hygiene and Public Health, Kolkata. He is notable for his work for sex workers in Sonagachi.

References 

Sex worker activists
Year of birth missing
2021 deaths
Activists from West Bengal
Indian activists
Indian health activists